Stalemate is the debut EP of SMP, self-released in 1994. The album was remastered by Chris Demarcus and re-released in 2016. The titletrack was provided to If It Moves... for their 1994 compilation Scavengers in the Matrix.

Track listing

Personnel
Adapted from the Stalemate liner notes.

SMP
 Jason Bazinet – lead vocals, production, engineering
 Sean Setterberg (as Sean Ivy) – instruments, production, engineering

Additional performers
 Mike Ditmore – drums (A1-A3, B1, B2)

Production and design
 T. Fallet – production, recording, mixing and engineering(B3)
 D.A. Sebasstian – production, recording, mixing and engineering (A1-A3, B1, B2)

Release history

References

External links 
 
 Stalemate Demo at iTunes

1994 debut EPs
SMP (band) albums